John Small (13 March 1726 – 17 March 1796) was a career British military officer from Scotland who played a key role in raising and leading the 84th Regiment of Foot (Royal Highland Emigrants) during the American Revolution. After the war, he settled with many of the men of the 84th Regiment in Douglas Township, Hants County, Nova Scotia. The British Crown granted land to soldiers after the war to encourage settlement, especially in Upper Canada (now Ontario).

Small is featured as one of the central figures in American artist John Trumbull's notable painting, The Death of General Warren at the Battle of Bunker's Hill, June 17, 1775; versions were completed in the early 19th century. Small is shown deflecting a bayonet away from General Warren, who had been a  friend before the hostilities broke out. Small returned to Great Britain after the war. He was appointed as Lieutenant Governor of Guernsey and promoted to major general, serving from 1793 until his death in 1796.

Early life 

Born at Strathardle, Atholl, he was the son of Patrick Small of Leanoch in Glen Shee, Scotland and Magdalen Robertson, daughter of Alexander Robertson, 5th Laird of Straloch, Perthshire. His brothers were Alexander Small, who became an army surgeon, and James Small, who was a factor.

John Small was a first cousin and close friend of John Robertson Reid, who became a general in the British Army. His niece, Magdalen (Small) MacDonald, was the mother of John MacDonald of Garth and Mrs. William McGillivray.  John Small and his relatives were members of the Smalls of Dirnanean, and are also related to the Small-Kiers of Kindrogan House.

At an early age Small's family purchased a commission for him to enter the Scots Brigade, and he served with them in the Netherlands. He was promoted to 2nd lieutenant in the Earl of Drumlanrig's Regiment when it was raised for service of the States General in 1747. In 1756, Small obtained a commission in the British Army, becoming a lieutenant in the Black Watch just before its departure for North America to fight in the Seven Years' War.

Seven Years' War

Lieutenant Small went to North America to fight for Great Britain against French Canadian forces in the Seven Years' War. On that front, the war became known to the colonists of the Thirteen Colonies as the French and Indian War, referring to France and its Native American allies. Small fought at the Battle of Fort Oswego in New York. Two years later, in 1758, he fought at the Battle of Ticonderoga, also in New York, under General James Abercrombie.

Following the defeat, he accompanied General Amherst on his successful expedition to Lake Champlain. He was with him at the Surrender of Montreal in 1760. In Montreal, Small was placed in charge of the French prisoners and took them to New York. General Amherst had great confidence in him, and frequently used him "on particular services".  In 1762, Small was promoted to captain. He sailed with his regiment to take part in the Invasion of Martinique and the British expedition against Cuba, as Great Britain tried to take more power in the Caribbean during the Seven Years' War.

Following the Treaty of Paris in 1763, Captain Small was placed on half-pay. According to General Stewart, he was almost immediately put on the full-pay list of the 21st North British Fusiliers. When the Black Watch left in 1767 for Europe, most of the men of that regiment, who had earlier volunteered to stay in North America, joined the Fusiliers in order to serve under Small. He was "deservedly popular" with them. That same year, Small was appointed brigade major to the forces in North America and returned there.

It may have been during the interval between the Seven Years' War and the American Revolution that Small began to acquire his estate, Selmah Hall, in Nova Scotia. He later bequeathed part of it to his first cousin, friend, and heir General John Robertson Reid. During this period, Small became interested in local politics and formed friendships with several influential Anglo-American politicians.

American Revolution

In 1765, Captain Small was placed in command of a company of the 21st Regiment of Foot, serving with them throughout the American Revolution. In 1775, he received an unofficial assignment from General Gage. Promoted to the rank of major, Small was sent to Nova Scotia to raise at his own expense the Young Royal Highlanders Regiment. This regiment was afterwards amalgamated into the 84th Regiment of Foot (Royal Highland Emigrants).

Battle of Bunker Hill, Boston 

As brigade major, Small fought at the first major battle of the American Revolution, the Battle of Bunker Hill in Boston, Massachusetts. In the course of that day, his life was saved by the American General Israel Putnam. Seeing Small standing alone at a time when all around him had fallen, Putnam struck up the barrels of his men's muskets to save his life.  Small and Putnam had served together during the Seven Years' War. Along with three other members of the 84th Regiment, Small was wounded in the arm by cannon fire.

84th Highland Regiment of Foot 

Small spent the most part of his time in New York on staff duty. Small was commander of the 84th Regiment of Foot (Royal Highland Emigrants), 2nd Battalion.

At the end of the war, the Crown aided many of its soldiers with land grants to settle in Nova Scotia and Upper Canada (current Ontario) in lieu of pay to encourage British colonization of the area. They often settled together as units, and the 84th Regiment of Foot settled in the Douglas Township in Hants County, Nova Scotia. (Some members had lived there before the war.) Small also lived there for a time, constructing a manor house called "Selmah Hall"; the community of Selma, Nova Scotia, was named for his property.

Postwar years

After the war, Small was thought to have advised American artist John Trumbull on his painting The Death of General Warren at the Battle of Bunker Hill. They met in London in 1786. Trumbull painted Major Small at the centre of the action, holding a bayonet to prevent a fellow British soldier from killing his friend, American Patriot Joseph Warren. (In fact, Warren was shot through the head during the battle and instantly killed by a musket ball). Trumbull wanted to express the divisions that the conflict created between people who were friends, yet were caught on opposite sides.

In describing the painting for a catalogue of his works, Trumbull explained why he chose to emphasize Major Small's role. He said that Small, whom he had met in London, "was equally distinguished by acts of humanity and kindness to his enemies, as by bravery and fidelity to the cause he served."

Later years
In 1793, Small was appointed as Lieutenant Governor of Guernsey and received his final promotion to major general. He died on Guernsey three years later, on 17 March 1796. He is buried within Saint Peter Port Church.

Small never married. At his death, his principal heir was his first cousin and good friend, John Robertson Reid. He left a valuable estate of four or five thousand acres in Nova Scotia to the general.

See also
Dearborn-Putnam controversy (Small's claim that General Israel Putnam was in the redoubt at the Battle of Bunker Hill is contested.)
The Soldiers' Trenches, Moor of Rannoch - A project led by his older brother.

References 

Primary Texts
 Oxford Dictionary of National Biography
 Biography of Major Small by Kim Stacy
 Katcher, Philip, Encyclopaedia of British, Provincial, and German Army Units 1775-1783, 1973,

External links
  Lieutenant John Small Biography
  Major General John Small on Find A Grave

1726 births
1796 deaths
Scottish emigrants to pre-Confederation Nova Scotia
42nd Regiment of Foot officers
People from Perth and Kinross
British Army generals
British Army personnel of the French and Indian War
Royal Scots Fusiliers officers
84th Regiment of Foot officers
British Army personnel of the American Revolutionary War
Loyalists who settled Nova Scotia